Stanislav Stanilov (Bulgarian: Станислав Станилов), (born 9 September 1943, in Gabrovo) is a Bulgarian archaeologist, historian and politician. Stanilov has been a member of the Attack since its founding in 2005 and became vice-chairman of its parliamentary group on 13 November 2007, a position which he still retains. In addition to his native Bulgarian, Stanilov is fluent in Russian and German.

References

1943 births
Living people
Historians of Bulgaria
Bulgarian archaeologists
Members of the National Assembly (Bulgaria)
Attack (political party) politicians